Mayuri may refer to:

 Mayuri (film), a 1984 Telugu film produced by Ramoji Rao
 Maya (2015 Tamil film), released as Mayuri in Telugu
 Mayoori (actress) (1983–2005), a South Indian actress in Malayalam film industry
 Mayuri Upadhya, the Artistic Director of Nritarutya Dance Collective
 Mayuri Kurotsuchi. a character in the Bleach anime and manga
 Mayuri, a character in the anime movie Date A Live: Mayuri Judgment
 Mayuri veena, a variant of the Taus